Marcel Larry Akunwata popularly known as Blaisebeatz or Blaise Beats, is a Nigerian record producer, and songwriter. He rose to stardom in 2020 with, the production hit "Pami" by DJ Tunez. His other production hits includes "Enjoy" by Tekno, "Sinner", "It Is What It Is", and "Mercy" by Adekunle Gold, "Call Me Every Day" by Chris Brown, "Buga" by Kizz Daniel, and "No Wahala" by 1da Banton. In 2022, he won the Afro Highlife Producer Of The Year and Afro Dancehall Producer Of The Year category at The Beatz Awards.

Early life, and career
Marcel Larry Akunwata hails from Anambra state. He grew up in Niger state, where he had his primary and secondary education before proceeding to the university to study statistics at the Federal University of Technology, Minna, where he graduated with a BSc.

Larry's musical journey started in 2004 when he began playing instruments in church and later joined a live band. In 2006, he ventured into music production and began using the stage name Larryblaise, and later changed his brand name to Blaisebeatz. In 2016, he gained recognition for his minor production hit "I Miss Good Music" by Jumabee, with features guest vocals from Banky W., Sound Sultan, Niyola, and Chigul, and "Nkechi" by Attitude.

In 2020, he rose to stardom with the release of "PAMI" by DJ Tunez, which features guest vocals from Wizkid, Omah Lay, and Adekunle Gold. Since he came into the limelight, he has been credited for multiple production hits, including "Suru" by Tekno, "Omaema" by Skiibi, "Nyamba" by Irene Ntale, "My Darlina" by King Perryy, "Fa'ya" by Ceeza Milli, "Kill Man" by Terri, "Okay" by Adekunle Gold, "Need More" by Reekado Banks, "Quarantine" by Alpha P, "In My Mind" by BNXN, "So Bad" by Simi, and "Cough (Odo)" by Kizz Daniel.

Artistry
He cited Timberland, Ryan Leslie, Don Jazzy, Masterkraft, and Sarz, as his influence.

Production discography
Albums/EPs produced

Awards and nominations

References

Living people
Nigerian record producers
Year of birth missing (living people)